"Stupid Love" is a song recorded by American singer Lady Gaga. The track was officially released on February 28, 2020, as the lead single from Gaga's sixth studio album, Chromatica (2020), after being leaked in January 2020. It was written by Gaga, Max Martin, Ely Rise, and the song's producers, Tchami and BloodPop. The lattermost stated this was what started his work on Chromatica with the singer. It is a house-infused dance-pop, electropop, and disco song that talks about gathering the courage to fall in love again after a heartbreak.

The single's release was preceded by billboards with stills from the accompanying music video and promotional photos posted on social media. It garnered positive response from music critics and was favorably compared to the singer's earlier works. Commercially, the song reached number one in Scotland, Hungary and El Salvador, as well as the top ten in Australia, Canada, Croatia, the Czech Republic, Greece, Ireland, Israel, Lebanon, Lithuania, Slovenia, Switzerland, the United Kingdom, and the United States.

An accompanying music video was directed by Daniel Askill and released on the same day as the single. It takes place in the fictional world Chromatica and shows Gaga leading the "Kindness Punks", performing choreography with groups of dance warriors, each group with a corresponding color. "Stupid Love" was also featured in a lip sync video, promoting Gaga's Haus Laboratories eyeshadow palette named after the track. The song received various remix edits, including one by Coucou Chloe on Gaga's remix album, Dawn of Chromatica (2021). Gaga performed "Stupid Love" at the 2020 MTV Video Music Awards and The Chromatica Ball concert tour (2022).

Recording and composition

"Stupid Love" was written for Lady Gaga's sixth studio album, Chromatica (2020) by Gaga with the help of BloodPop, Tchami, Max Martin, and Ely Rise; BloodPop and Tchami also served as the track's producers. According to BloodPop, he first played the instrumental of the song to Gaga at the Kansas City stop of her Joanne World Tour while they were working on songs for the soundtrack to her movie, A Star Is Born (2018). While none of those songs made the soundtrack, working together on "Stupid Love" was fruitful and convinced BloodPop into committing to co-produce the singer's entire album.

BloodPop felt the demo of the song "was missing something", and he credits Max Martin with having "some fantastic ideas that really elevated it". The track marks the first time Gaga worked with Martin. Gaga admitted she was at first hesitant to work with Martin, as she likes to write and produce on her own terms, but "decided to stop being an asshole" and meet him. She explained: "Basically, I sang over a track that BloodPop made. We sent over what I sang to Max, Max picked some parts out, sent it back to me, and then I wrote lyrics. I warmed up my voice, got in the booth, I sang it, and what you're hearing on 'Stupid Love' is what we did that day."

"Stupid Love" has been described as a return to the dance-pop, electropop and house sound of Gaga's earlier career, with influences of dance, disco, and electronic. Dan Adler of Vanity Fair noted "Lady Gaga's new single 'Stupid Love' arrives in declarations: 'All I ever wanted was love;' 'I want your stupid love.' She issues them over glittering dance pop, and they're less plaintive than euphoric—the act of expression is the triumph." The song is composed in the key of B Mixolydian and is played at a tempo of 118 beats per minute. Gaga's vocals span from A3 to F5 in the song. The lyrics talk about the "joyful foolishness of loving someone" and gathering the courage to fall in love again after a heartbreak. The Daily Beast Kevin Fallon opined that in contrast with the rest of Chromatica, the track "almost entirely rejects a search for deep meaning." Explaining the song's background, Gaga further elaborated: "...When we all decide to be vulnerable [...] it's very scary for a lot of people and there's all kinds of laws and constructs and things that have built all around us... I'd love for it to collapse as many of those walls as possible and people to be saying, 'I want your Stupid Love. I love you.

Release and promotion
Clips of the song first leaked online in January 2020, shortly followed by the entire track leaking. The song went viral on Twitter. Gaga responded to the leak by tweeting "can y'all stop" with a stock photo of a young girl wearing a balaclava while listening to music on a cassette player. Gaga did not perform "Stupid Love" during her AT&T TV Super Saturday Night pre-Super Bowl LIV show in Miami, despite requests from audience members. Instead, Gaga performed her Enigma set from her Las Vegas residency and did not address the leaked track. Online chatter of the song began as early as October 30, 2019, when Gaga posted a picture to her Twitter of a Halloween pumpkin she painted. In the corner of the photo was an iPod Touch; when zoomed in it appeared to show "Stupid Love" being played on the device.

Gaga announced the song's release via social media on February 25, 2020. After the song leaked, she and her manager had a discussion if they should choose another song for the lead single, even though they spent months developing the music video and its choreography; they decided to go with the original plan. She explained: "...The song, when it's mixed, mastered and finished with the visuals, and everything I have to say about it — when all those things come together at once, that will be the art piece I'm making. Not a leak." The announcement of the single was accompanied with a photograph of a billboard in Los Angeles that had the song's title "splashed across an image of bright pink lips." The billboard also featured stills from the music video and a silhouette of characters in the video ingrained in the text. Chromatica is written twice on the billboard: once vertically adjacent to the music video stills, and again as the last line of the copyright message in the lower left corner. The prominence of the word led news outlets to speculate Chromatica as the title of Gaga's sixth studio album.

Jeena Sharma of Paper magazine described promotional images of Gaga for "Stupid Love" as "pop-meets-punk". The images featured Gaga wearing a pink monochromatic look with makeup from her Haus Laboratories beauty line. Just before dropping "Stupid Love" and its music video, Gaga tweeted "Earth is cancelled". In the hours after its release, both the song "Stupid Love" and Lady Gaga herself were the top two trending topics on Twitter worldwide. The song was placed at the top of Apple Music's Today's Top Hits playlist, Spotify's New Music Daily playlist, and Spotify's Today's Hits playlist. On May 18, 2020, a lip sync video was released for the song, promoting Gaga's Haus Laboratories eyeshadow palette named after "Stupid Love". The video features influencers from the world of makeup, including drag queens Alaska and Aquaria.

Critical reception 
"Stupid Love" received positive reviews from music critics; many of them noted a return to Gaga's dance-pop roots. Following the leak, W magazine's Kyle Munzenrieder wrote, "It was classic Gaga with a chugging power chorus, and a big room backing track. Her fans began dissecting what it told us about the upcoming album. Gaga herself, however, wasn't having it." Commenting on the leak, Harper's Bazaar described "Stupid Love" as an "upbeat cut with big vocals and dance and electronic-inspired production", seemingly "poised to be another radio hit from the singer". Variety described the leak as a "disco-infused anthem whose style harkens back to Gaga's Born This Way album".

Upon the song's official release, Michael Cuby of Nylon described it as a "mix between 'Bad Kids' and 'The Edge of Glory' with a beat that instantly recalls the joyous electropop of 'Do What U Want and "the type of song you can easily imagine both blasting out of an expensive sound-system at your local gay club and out of a car speaker as it speeds down the highway with its top down in the summertime." Jamieson Cox for Pitchfork also compared the song to "Do What U Want", saying the "brawny, shiny disco" of "Stupid Love" sounds like a sped-up version of the former. Cox claims "Stupid Love" recalls Gaga's late 2000s era "without achieving the same kind of grandeur", yet welcomes Gaga's return and "the goofy, indomitable spirit that made her so refreshing in the first place." Writing for Rolling Stone, Claire Shaffer and Althea Legaspi described the song as a "dance jam", while Ben Kaye of Consequence named it an "electronic disco banger". Sarah Jamieson from DIY thought that the track provides "maximalist addictiveness".

Spencer Kornhaber from The Atlantic called the single a "glorious comeback" and a "return to form not only for the singer, but also for her genre." Kornhaber added that even though the Max Martin production "feels perfectly calibrated for catchiness, Gaga's voice is so big and personable that a sense of humanity remains intact" and concluded "Stupid Love" is "light, sweet, and orderly." Kornhaber also praised BloodPop and Tchami's keyboard work and mixing of the song, mentioning the microseconds before the drop of the final chorus, calling it a "fake-out that tricks the ear every time, as superfans who’ve been giddily listening to the song since it leaked in January can attest." Stephen Daw from Billboard thought that the song "offers spine-tingling pop euphoria" and highlighted the "unbridled joy in Gaga's voice". For Slant Magazine, Alexa Camp was more critical of the track, describing it as a "catchy but uninventive slice of electro-pop" and compared its bassline to "Do What U Want". Michael Cragg from The Guardian called the song "fun and dumb".

Consequence named "Stupid Love" the sixth best song of 2020, calling it "a perfect pop song" and stating it's "exactly what we’ve wanted from Lady Gaga for a long, long time". Other publications, including Billboard and Rolling Stone, also included "Stupid Love" on their lists of the best songs of the year.

Chart performance
In the US, "Stupid Love" debuted at number five on the Billboard Hot 100, becoming Gaga's sixteenth top ten hit, twelfth top five hit, and her highest-debuting entry since "The Edge of Glory" debuted at number three in 2011. It also marked her first top 10 debut since "Dope", when it entered at number eight in November 2013, and first top ten hit since "Shallow" peaked at number one in March 2019. Additionally, with "Stupid Love", Gaga became the fifth artist to have ranked in the Hot 100's top 10 in the 2000s, 2010s and 2020s. The song debuted at the summit on Digital Songs, with 53,000 downloads sold, becoming Gaga's seventh leader on the chart. It also debuted at number one on the Hot Dance/Electronic Songs chart, becoming her fifth topper and twenty-eighth charted title, the most of any solo female; "Stupid Love" also became the first song to debut at number one on the chart. "Stupid Love" descended to number 30 on the Hot 100 in its second week and spent a total of 10 weeks on the chart altogether. In Canada, the song debuted and peaked at number seven on the Canadian Hot 100. The song was certified Platinum by the Music Canada (MC) for selling over 80,000 units.

"Stupid Love" debuted at number seven in Australia and number 23 in New Zealand, which became its peak in both regions. It was present for seven weeks on the former nation's chart, while in New Zealand it dropped off after two weeks. Official Charts Company reported, that the song is challenging for UK number one based preliminary sales and early streaming reports. "Stupid Love" was just shy of 1,200 chart sales behind the number one spot, occupied by The Weeknd's "Blinding Lights" after two days of downloads and streams. The Weeknd had the edge on streaming, with Gaga ahead on downloads. The song later debuted at number five on the UK Singles Chart, becoming Gaga's thirteenth top 10 in the country. It was certified Gold by the British Phonographic Industry (BPI) for 400,000 copies of streaming equivalent units. In Ireland, "Stupid Love" debuted at number six as the week's highest new entry and most downloaded track of the week; it also became her fifteenth top 10 in the country. Elsewhere, "Stupid Love"s highest position was attained in Scotland, Hungary, and El Salvador, where it reached the top of the charts.

Music video

Concept and development

The video was filmed on January 24, 2020. It was directed by Daniel Askill and filmed on location at Trona Pinnacles, California. It was filmed entirely using Apple's iPhone 11 Pro triple camera system, with Askill saying that by not relying on "bigger, much more expensive cameras", they had "lot of new possibilities and freedoms [...] to explore". The iPhones were mounted on drones and Steadicams, and the Filmic Pro app was used for capturing footage.

The main concept of the clip was bringing different kinds of people together under music and dance. It is represented with separate groups of dancers, each forming a unique tribe with a corresponding color and logo – according to the singer, they are the "Kindness Punks" in pink, the "Freedom Fighters" in blue, the "Junkyard Scavengers" in black, the "Government Officials" in red, the "Eco Warriors" in green, and the "Cyber Kids" in yellow. The video's choreographer, Richy Jackson, auditioned around 1000 dancers in Los Angeles for the video, with the objective to hire a diverse cast of dancers. To highlight the differences between the tribes, he wanted to create different choreography for each of them; he explained: "The black-leather tribe's movement and the way they looked, from a styling perspective, inspired a hip-hop vibe. Our yellow tribe is into techy skills, so I thought they should move more abstract and awkward. I call our green tribe the House of Climate Change, because they look like a mini house within the [bigger] house, so in that [vein], they needed a voguing style! The red and blue tribes... were the strongest, so, no matter what, they'll never break or back down, so the movement had to represent that feeling." Richy also added that it was his idea to use sign language for Gaga's tribe, as he really liked the "All I ever wanted was love!" line and felt it required more than dance to express it accurately.

In a Harper's Bazaar interview with Gaga's makeup artist, Sarah Tanno, Tanno described using pieces that evoke armor to satisfy Gaga's desire to feel strong for the video. Describing Gaga's wishes, Tanno explains, "she wanted to exude a 'Kindness Punk', someone who fights for kindness and leads with love." Tanno sought inspiration from a prior era in Gaga's career in creating Gaga's face pieces for the music video. "In the Born This Way era she had these cheek prosthetics—so I thought, what is the new special thing that I can make for her? This armor naturally will come in different shades of metallic pink," explained Tanno. Wanting the pieces to move with Gaga as she moved and danced, Tanno crafted the face pieces out of materials resembling bone prosthetics, instead of opting for metal. Unlike the face pieces, Gaga's costumes featured pieces crafted of actual metal, designed by Laurel DeWitt. "The mood boards were a crazy mash of futuristic armor, aliens, and even an insect type vibe. Everything had to be pink so I worked with her style team and just did my interpretation on it. Pink metal! I mean c'mon! It was perfect,"  DeWitt described. The four different outfits crafted for Gaga by DeWitt and Gaga's pink wig were seen as a departure from Gaga's previous style. DeWitt added that Gaga loved the styles, but she found some to be painful to wear, concluding, "you know Gaga, anything for fashion."

Synopsis and reception

The video debuted online and on MTV on February 28, 2020, with teasers being released one day prior. It opens with the text "The world rots in conflict. Many tribes battle for dominance. While the Spiritual ones pray and sleep for peace, the Kindness punks fight for Chromatica." The camera pans to a desert scene with crystal mountains, on the fictional planet Chromatica. Gaga and her squad are running to the scene of a battle. The singer is seen in various hot pink outfits dancing it out with groups of dance warriors. Once the factions begin to fight again, Gaga cannot take it anymore. She levitates two fighters and slams them back to the ground; with that move, the battle is won. Gaga leads the dance warriors into one big celebration to conclude the video. The faction in pink, led by Gaga, restored peace to the desert region.

British Vogue thought Gaga looked like a "Y2K-inspired desert warrior" in the music video and called the singer's aesthetics a return to her "meat-dress-era form". Dave Holmes for Esquire described Gaga's dancing in the video as "back to a kind of movement that is less 'dance' and more a series of gestures. The classics are back: 'wrists on forehead' makes a triumphant return, as do 'hand covering eye' and 'forearms in x formation'." Craig Jenkins for Vulture described the video as a "purposeful visual overkill" with tight choreography and compared the video to the music video for "Genesis" by Grimes, the video game Bayonetta, and 1960s-era Star Trek. Brandon Wetmore for Paper magazine called the video as a Mad Max-evoking "pride parade", pairing "Bad Romance"-era choreography with Artpop-era camp, and he contrasted the vibrancy and color of the video with the muted, somber visuals from the A Star Is Born era. Sabrina Barr of The Independent highlighted the "outlandish" costumes of the video, saying that "the fashion in the video is as idiosyncratic and fabulous as Gaga herself" and pointed out inspirations from Power Rangers and the Alien films. Alexa Camp for Slant Magazine was critical of the video, calling it corny and lacking "the (comparatively) sophisticated mythology or narrative of videos like 2011's 'Born This Way'."

Remixes 
On May 15, 2020, the Vitaclub Warehouse Mix of "Stupid Love" was released, produced by BloodPop and Burns. It has "a more club-leaning appeal" than the original, "filtering [the main version’s] vocal chops against a thumping four-on-the-floor house arrangement". The track later appeared on the Target and international deluxe edition of Chromatica. The Japanese version of Chromatica also includes the Ellis remix of "Stupid Love" as a bonus track.

For Gaga's third remix album, Dawn of Chromatica (2021), "Stupid Love" received a "splashy reimagining" from French producer Coucou Chloe, which "strips away the lead single's bubblegum beats to reveal a macabre midnight romp". In his review of Dawn of Chromatica, Robin Murray from Clash called Coucou's "Stupid Love" remix, along with Lsdxoxo's take on "Alice", "dancefloor bumpers". Writing for Gigwise, Alex Rigotti compared the remix unfavorably to Coucou's previous "dark, freaky" productions, thinking this time she was "way more conventional". She added that "the remix does take an interesting turn towards the end, but overall there could have been more artistic risks taken." Alexa Camp of Slant Magazine dismissed the remix, saying that "Stupid Love" was stripped "of its ingratiating hook".

Live performances

On August 30, 2020, Gaga performed "Stupid Love" as the final number of a medley of songs from Chromatica at the 2020 MTV Video Music Awards. She started the performance with a stripped-down rendition of the track, playing on a brain-shaped piano. She then gave a short speech about the importance of being kind and wearing a face mask due to the ongoing COVID-19 pandemic. After being joined by her dancers on stage, she continued with a live band version of "Stupid Love". Gaga was wearing a pink bodysuit and a sound-reactive LED mask for the gig. Billboard highlighted the performance of "Stupid Love" as "a surprising standout", where Gaga showcased her "raw vocals" while playing the piano, before turning the song "into the dance-ready ball that Chromatica is all about."

In 2022, the singer performed an extended version of "Stupid Love" at The Chromatica Ball stadium tour, where it was part of the finale to the show. She was wearing a crystal-embellished latex bodysuit and leather biker jacket by Alexander McQueen, along with leather biker boots worn over black fishnet stockings. David Cobbald of The Line of Best Fit noted that Gaga "doesn’t falter her choreography for the sweat-rinsed hair in her face...", while Lauren O'Neill from i said that Gaga "played 'Stupid Love', dancing the choreography with the abandon that has always characterised her live show."

Track listing
Digital download and streaming
 "Stupid Love" – 3:13

7"/cassette/CD
 "Stupid Love" – 3:13
 "Stupid Love" (instrumental) – 3:13

Digital download and streaming (Vitaclub Warehouse Mix)
 "Stupid Love" (Vitaclub Warehouse Mix) [featuring Vitaclub] – 3:40

Credits and personnel
Credits adapted from Tidal.

 Lady Gaga – vocals, songwriter
 BloodPop – producer, songwriter, bass, drums, guitar, keyboards, percussion, programming
 Tchami – producer, songwriter, mixer, bass, drums, guitar, keyboards, percussion programming
 Max Martin – co-producer, songwriter, vocal producer
 Ely Rise – songwriter
 Benjamin Rice – vocal producer, mixer, recording engineer
 Tom Norris – mixer
 E. Scott Kelly – assistant mixer
 John "JR" Robinson – drums

Notes

Charts

Weekly charts

Monthly charts

Year-end charts

Certifications

Release history

See also
 List of Billboard Digital Song Sales number ones of 2020
 List of Billboard Hot 100 top-ten singles in 2020
 List of German airplay number-one songs of 2020
 List of number-one digital songs of 2020 (Canada)
 List of top 10 singles in 2020 (Ireland)
 List of UK Singles Sales Chart number ones
 List of UK top-ten singles in 2020

References

2020 singles
2020 songs
American dance-pop songs
American house music songs
Electropop songs
Interscope Records singles
Lady Gaga songs
Music videos directed by Daniel Askill
Song recordings produced by BloodPop
Songs written by BloodPop
Songs written by Lady Gaga
Songs written by Max Martin
Songs written by Tchami